The Sri Lanka Interbank Payment System, commonly known as SLIPS, is a LKR-only online interbank payment and fund transfer system in Sri Lanka.

SLIPS is owned by LankaClear, an organization owned by the Central Bank of Sri Lanka and all Licensed Commercial Banks operating in Sri Lanka, with 47.19% of shares held by the CBSL and State owned commercial banks, and 52.81% by other private banks. SLIPS transfers are designed primarily for catering low-value payments up to LKR 5 million (equivalent to approximately US$36,000).

See also 
 LankaPay
 Economy of Sri Lanka
 http://www.lankaclear.com/

References 

Payment networks
Banking in Sri Lanka
Interbank networks